P84 may refer to:

 , a patrol boat of the Royal Australian Navy
 Hunting-Percival P.84 Jet Provost, a British trainer aircraft
 p87PIKAP, phosphoinositide-3-kinase adapter protein of 87 kDa
 Papyrus 84, a biblical manuscript
 Polyimide P84
 Republic XP-84 Thunderjet, an American turbojet fighter-bomber
 P84, a state regional road in Latvia